BandaOke! Rock 'N Roll to Millions is a Philippine television game show by GMA Network. Hosted by Jaya and Allan K., it premiered on October 25, 2009. The show concluded on March 21, 2010 with a total of 22 episodes. It was replaced by Claudine in its timeslot.

Cast

Hosts
 Jaya
 Allan K.

Band
 Frencheska Farr
 Geoff Taylor
 Jay Perillo
 Tim Mallilin - bass
 Weckl Mercado - lead guitar
 Michael Gemina - drums
 Ivan Espinosa - piano
 Iean Iñigo - 2nd keyboard

Format
BandaOke opens with a grand number showcasing the two game masters jamming with a band specially formed for the show. The number leads to three rounds of live band-videoke singing showdown between two teams of celebrity players, each headed by a celebrity bandmaster. Members of the winning team of rounds 1 to 3 then face off in the One-on-One-on-One round to determine the jackpot player. The jackpot player advances to one final round where a 1-million pesos cash prize is at stake.

Ratings
According to AGB Nielsen Philippines' Mega Manila household television ratings, the pilot episode of BandaOke earned a 19.2% rating. While the final episode scored a 13% rating.

References

External links
 

2009 Philippine television series debuts
2010 Philippine television series endings
Filipino-language television shows
GMA Network original programming
Philippine game shows